Sherridan Kirk (born February 11, 1981 on Tobago) is an athlete from Trinidad and Tobago who specializes in the 800 metres and 4 x 400 metres relay. He attended the Kansas City Kansas Community College and Auburn University in the United States.

Achievements

Video Interview
Flotrack.com Video Interview of Sheridan Kirk during the 100th Millrose Games

Personal life

References

External links
 
Best of Trinidad

1981 births
Living people
Trinidad and Tobago male middle-distance runners
Auburn Tigers men's track and field athletes
Olympic athletes of Trinidad and Tobago
Athletes (track and field) at the 2004 Summer Olympics
Pan American Games competitors for Trinidad and Tobago
Athletes (track and field) at the 2003 Pan American Games
Athletes (track and field) at the 2007 Pan American Games
Commonwealth Games competitors for Trinidad and Tobago
Athletes (track and field) at the 2002 Commonwealth Games
Athletes (track and field) at the 2006 Commonwealth Games
Central American and Caribbean Games silver medalists for Trinidad and Tobago
Competitors at the 2006 Central American and Caribbean Games
Central American and Caribbean Games medalists in athletics